Luba Mushtuk (Russian: Люба Муштук; born 14 November 1989) is a Russian dancer and choreographer.

Early life
Mushtuk was born in Saint Petersburg, Russia.

Career
Mushtuk was four-time winner of the Italian Dance Championship and is also an Italian Open Latin Show Dance champion. She came in second place in the European 10 Dance Championships and was a finalist at the Latin European Championships. 
In 2018, the BBC announced that Mushtuk would join the cast of professional dancers on the British television show Strictly Come Dancing. She won the 2018 Children In Need special with Shane Lynch. She also competed in the 2018 Christmas special, paired with EastEnders actor and Strictly Come Dancing 2014 contestant, Jake Wood. She danced with Jay Blades for the 2021 Strictly Come Dancing Christmas Special. She danced with Rickie Haywood Williams for the 2022 Strictly Come Dancing Christmas Special.

For Series 17 of Strictly, Mushtuk was partnered with rower James Cracknell. They were the first couple to be eliminated after losing the first dance-off to David James & Nadiya Bychkova.

For series 18, she was partnered with former NFL player and sports pundit, Jason Bell. They were the second couple to be eliminated after losing the second dance-off to Nicola Adams & Katya Jones

Strictly Come Dancing Results

Performances with James Cracknell

Performances with Jason Bell

References

Russian ballroom dancers
Living people
1989 births